This is a list of members of the sixth Limpopo Provincial Legislature, as elected in the election of 8 May 2019 and taking into account changes in membership since the election.

Current composition 

|-style="background:#e9e9e9;"
!colspan="2" style="text-align:left"| Party !! style="text-align:center"| Seats 
|-
|  || 38 
|-
|  || 7 
|-
|  || 3 
|-
|  || 1 
|-
|colspan="2" style="text-align:left"| Total || style="text-align:right"| 49 
|}

Members

The ANC's Lehlogonolo Masoga resigned during the first session of the legislature and was replaced by Joshua Matlou in August 2019. In January 2020, Tshitereke Matibe was sworn in as a member after Goodman Mitileni, also of the ANC, resigned to take up a party position. In October 2022, Premier Stan Mathabatha announced that Jerry Ndou and Dickson Masemola would resign and take up seats in the National Council of Provinces (NCOP); their seats in the provincial legislature were filled by Tebogo Mamorobela and Lilliet Mamaregane, both formerly of the NCOP. Matibe succeeded Ndou as Deputy Speaker.

References

Legislature